Alimena is a comune (municipality) in the Metropolitan City of Palermo in the Italian region of Sicily, located about  southeast of Palermo. 
 
Alimena borders the following municipalities: Blufi, Bompietro, Gangi, Petralia Soprana, Petralia Sottana, Resuttano, Santa Caterina Villarmosa, Villarosa.

References

External links

Official website

Municipalities of the Metropolitan City of Palermo
Articles which contain graphical timelines